John Egan (born 9 August 1937) is a Scottish retired professional footballer who played as a left winger in the Scottish League and the English Football League.

References

1937 births
Living people
People from Kilsyth
Scottish footballers
Ballymena United F.C. players
Accrington Stanley F.C. (1891) players
Stranraer F.C. players
Stenhousemuir F.C. players
Halifax Town A.F.C. players
Nelson F.C. players
English Football League players
Dunipace F.C. players
Association football midfielders
Footballers from North Lanarkshire